Kurt Goldschmid (4 August 1919 – 31 December 1979) was a Swiss field hockey player. He competed in the men's tournament at the 1952 Summer Olympics.

References

External links
 

1919 births
1979 deaths
Swiss male field hockey players
Olympic field hockey players of Switzerland
Field hockey players at the 1952 Summer Olympics
Place of birth missing